Triotech  is a manufacturer of out-of-home multi-sensory interactive attractions.
Since 2006, TRIOTECH has operated its own studio to develop custom content for its attractions. Founded in 1999, TRIOTECH is a privately held company based in Canada with offices in the US, Europe, and China. with research and development facilities as well as a movie studio in Montreal, Quebec.

They are known for their motion simulators such as XD Theatres and XD Dark Ride interactive theaters.

Background
Triotech designs, develops, and markets immersive and interactive out-of-home cinemas and platforms, as well as small 3-dimensional movie theaters.  They distribute their products under XD Theater, XD DarK Ride, Interactive Dark Ride, Flying Theaters, immersive Walkthroughs, and Typhoon.

In 2006, Triotech opened a Montreal-based 3D animation studio to create custom content, to work in conjunction with the parent company's line of theme park motion rides.

In 2019 Triotech announced the acquisition of a French company CL Corp, forming the largest media-based experiences group in the attractions industry.

XD Theater is a 3D film attraction. When first released, XD Theater included the 3D ride films Cosmic Coaster, Haunted Mine and Arctic Run.  There are now over 40 3D films in Triotech's XD Theater library. The ultimate immersive ride with real time 3D stereoscopic graphics combined with visual FX for a multi sensory experience, a motion simulated thrill ride that transcends time, space and imagination. 

XD Dark Ride is an interactive theater using group play, real-time 3D graphics and individual scoring system to create unique, competitive dynamics. This multi-sensory, interactive attraction, designed for the whole family, won IAAPA's prestigious Brass Ring Award for Best New Product in 2013.

Products
Interactive Dark Ride (some ride systems have been provided by Zamperla)
Ghostbusters 5D at Heide Park in Soltau, Germany 
Ninjago The Ride at Legoland Resorts in Legoland California, Legoland Florida, Legoland Deutschland, Legoland Windsor, Legoland Malaysia, Legoland Billund and Legoland New York
Sholay: The hunt for Gabbar Singh at Dubai Parks and Resorts
The Flyer – San Francisco at Pier39 in San Francisco, USA 
Finding Larva and Larva's Space Adventure (from Larva's TV Series) at Jeju Shinhwa World 
Gan Gun Battlers at Tokyo Dome in Tokyo, Japan
Wonder Mountain's Guardian at Canada's Wonderland in Vaughan, Ontario
Knott's Bear-y Tales: Return to the Fair at Knott's Berry Farm in Buena Park, CA
7D Experience XD Dark Ride in San Francisco, CA
Typhoon
STORM™ interactive multiplayer coin-op simulator  
XD Theatres immersive theaters
 Interactive Cinema
Over 40 3D animated films
Wasteland Racers 2071
UFO Stomper
Qube
Hyper Ride

References

External links
 

Canadian companies established in 1999
Privately held companies of Canada